Mẫu Thoải (Chữ Hán: 母水, or Thủy Cung Thánh Mẫu is a goddess in Vietnamese non-Buddhist traditional religion. The goddess features in Chầu văn religious ceremonies and music. 

She presides over the heavenly water palace Thoải Phủ, one of the Four Palaces (Tứ Phủ) where the "spirits of the Four Palaces" (thánh Tứ Phủ) correspond to the elements.

References

Vietnamese goddesses
Vietnamese culture
Vietnamese folk religion
Vietnamese deities
Vietnamese gods